College of Art, New Delhi,  established in 1942 under the arts department of the Delhi College of Engineering now the Delhi Technological University (DTU), is an art college for advanced training in Visual Art. It is run by the Government of NCT Delhi. It is situated on Tilak Marg, New Delhi.In 2021, the Government of NCT Delhi has de-affiliated the college from Delhi University and merged it with Ambedkar University Delhi.

Courses offered

The college offers courses both at graduate and post-graduate levels; It offers courses in most mediums of Visual Art, both Creative and Applied Art. This includes Master of Fine Art (MFA, a post graduation course of two year in duration) in Applied Art, Printmaking, Sculpture, Visual Communication and Bachelor of Fine Art (BFA, an undergraduate course with 4 years duration) in Applied Art, Art History, Printmaking, Sculpture, Visual Communication. It imparts training in art techniques with emphasis on studio practicals, outdoor practicals, prescribed theory subjects and research in selected fields.

Overview
Art Education stalwarts such as Ramendranath Chakravarty, B.C.Sanyal, Biswanath Mukherjee, O.P.Sharma, have since its inception, headed and nurtured this institution. The present Faculty also includes from such members, Prof. B.S.Chauhan (Principal), Prof. Meera Sarvanan, Prof. Jyotika Sehgal, Dr. Amargeet Chandok, Sh. Ashok Ninawe, Sh. Kripal Singh, Sh. R.K. Mahajan, Sh. Ch. Omkarachari, Sh. Kandagiri Ramesh, Dr. Sumita Kathuria, Dr. Kumar Jigeeshu.
The Annual Art Exhibition of the college, put by students is held every year during the month of March, which is the only time students are allowed to stay back over night inside the college premises.
Hindustan Times and Times of India always cover these exhibition.

In 2008, the college added  an auditorium, designed by architect as-well-as an artist Satish Gujral to its campus.

Notable alumni

 Shekhar Gurera (1986–90)
 Gogi Saroj Pal 
 Harun Robert
 Pradeep Sarkar (1975–79) (film maker)
 Subhod Gupta
 Paresh Maity
 Amba Sanyal
 Gopi Gajwani

References

Universities and colleges in Delhi
Delhi University
Educational institutions established in 1942
Art schools in India
1942 establishments in India